Bang Bang Boom Boom is the sixth studio album by American singer-songwriter Beth Hart, released on October 5, 2012 by Provogue/Mascot Label.

Track listing

Personnel

Musicians
 Beth Hart – Piano, Vocals
 Lee Thornburg – Horn Arrangements, Trombone, Trumpet
 Curt Bisquera – Drums
 Herman Matthews – Drums
 Anton Fig – Drums
 Lenny Castro – Percussion
 Joe Bonamassa – Guitar, Soloist
 Randy Flowers – Guitar
 Michael Rhodes – Bass
 Jeff Bova – String Arrangements
 Ron Dziubla – Saxophone
 Arlan Schierbaum – Organ

Production
 Rune Westberg – Engineer, Mixing, producer, Lyrics (Tracks 2 & 7)
 Kevin Shirley – Mixing, producer
 Scott Guetzkow – Executive Producer
 David Wolff – Executive Producer
 Bob Ludwig – Mastering
 Josh La Count – Recording Assistant
 Jared Kvitka – Engineer
 Beth Hart – Lyrics
 Monty Byrom – Lyrics (Track 3)
 James House – Lyrics (Track 4)
 Juan Winans – Lyrics (Track 6)
 Marcus Bird – photography and direction
 Cathy Highland – Hair Stylist, Make-Up
 Sasa Jalali – Wardrobe
 Jeff Katz – Photography
 Roy Koch – Package Design

Charts

References

2012 albums
Beth Hart albums